Bodwad railway station serves Bodwad in Jalgaon district in the Indian state of Maharashtra.

Amenities
Amenities at Bodwad railway station include: computerized reservation office, waiting room, retiring room and book stall.

Trains

Daily Express trains
Several daily Express trains stop at Bodwad station as follows.

Electrification
Railways in the Bodwad area were electrified in 1988–89.

See also

High-speed rail in India
Indian Railways
Jalgaon District
Rail transport in India
List of railway stations in India

References

External links 
  Departures from Bodwad
Indian Railway Map
 Ministry of Indian Railways, Official website
 Indian Railways Live Information, Official website
Book Indian Railway Tickets
Station Code official list.
Indian Railways Station List.
Indian Railway Station Codes 
Train Running Status
Indian Railway Map, Official website
History of Electrification 

Railway stations in Jalgaon district
Bhusawal railway division
Railway stations opened in 1863